A special election for Cagayan's 2nd district seat in the House of Representatives of the Philippines was held on March 12, 2011. The special election was called after the incumbent representative, Florencio Vargas died in July 2010. Vargas' daughter, Baby Aline Vargas-Alfonso, was elected after beating former Cagayan Governor Edgar Lara, Vargas' opponent in the 2010 election. Alfonso would then serve the remainder of her father's term which ended in 2013.

Background
Incumbent representative Florencio Vargas of Lakas-Kampi-CMD won the general election on May 10, 2010. His term began on June 30, but he died on July 22, a few days before the 15th Congress convened. The two other congressmen from Cagayan, Jack Enrile and Randolph Ting, then filed a resolution declaring Vargas' seat vacant paving way for a special election. Defeated candidate and former governor Edgar Lara had previously expressed interest in participating if a special election was called, and also said that he expects any member of the Vargas family to run as well. On December 13, Enrile Jr. was designated by Speaker Feliciano Belmonte Jr. as the caretaker of the 2nd district pending the approval of a special election.

The Commission on Elections has set the election on March 12, 2011, Saturday. The period for the filing of certificates of candidacy will be from February 21 to 25, and the campaign period will be from February 26 to March 10. Unlike the general election, the special election will be conducted manually.

Campaign
Only two candidates ran. Lara, formerly of the Nationalist People's Coalition, was the ruling Liberal Party's nominee for the special election, while Vargas' daughter, Abulug vice mayor Baby Aline Vargas-Alfonso, was his opponent.

President Aquino and the ruling Liberal Party supported Lara's candidacy, while Cagayan governor Alvaro Antonio and 1st district representative Jack Enrile's Team Cagayan coalition supported Alfonso, the daughter of the late representative. Alfonso is running under the Lakas Kampi CMD banner.

Results

 
 
 
 
 

Alfonso was declared the winner after the Commission on Elections finished canvassing in ten of the twelve municipalities in the district. The low turnout was blamed on residents residing outside the district not returning to their homes during the weekend, and the aftermath of the 2011 Tōhoku earthquake and tsunami in which voters were discouraged from casting their votes when residents from the coastal towns of the district evacuated due to a tsunami alert and only returned morning of election day.

Alfonso was sworn in as a member of the House of Representatives on March 16, raising its membership to 284, the largest in its history.

2010 election result

References

External links
COMELEC Resolution No. 9109

2011 elections in the Philippines
Special elections to the Congress of the Philippines
Politics of Cagayan